Adrian Burgess is a motorsport team manager.

Career
After working his way through the Formula Three ranks, Burgess became a number one mechanic at Bowman Racing, engineering David Brabham to the 1989 title. In 1991 he joined McLaren working on its Formula One program. In 1999, he returned to Formula Three with Carlin Motorsport. In 2005 he returned to Formula One with Jordan Grand Prix as sporting director.

In 2007 Burgress emigrated to Australia to manage V8 Supercars team Dick Johnson Racing, moving to Triple Eight Race Engineering in 2011, the Holden Racing Team in 2014 and Tekno Autosports in 2018.

In December 2018, Burgess became the Supercars Championship's head of motorsport.

References

Formula One managers
Living people
McLaren people
Australian motorsport people
Year of birth missing (living people)